Gavin Peers (born 10 November 1985) is an Irish football coach and former player, who is currently the first-team coach at Longford Town.

Career
Peers started his footballing career at Blackburn Rovers, and later moved to Mansfield Town, where he made 30 total appearances. He was signed for Sligo Rovers by Sean Connor following the club's promotion to the Premier Division and played regularly at right-back that year. The following year following the departure of centre-backs Michael McNamara and Liam Burns Peers moved into the centre of defence. Injuries forced him to miss much of the 2009 League of Ireland season and his presence was badly missed. He did recover in time to take his place in the team for the 2009 FAI Cup Final, but it would end in disappointment with Sporting Fingal winning 2-1.

The following year was much better with Peers playing consistently and Sligo having a fantastic season that saw him play in both the FAI Cup and League of Ireland Cup finals. He played a major role in the 2010 FAI Cup victory by scoring the winning goal in the 1-0 semi-final win over Bohemian at Dalymount Park. Following the departure of Conor O'Grady at the end of the 2010 season Peers became the club's longest serving player.

Sligo Rovers repeated the FAI Cup success in 2011 this time beating Shelbourne in the final. Peers had one of his most consistent seasons making a career-best 46 appearances over the season. The next season brought even more success as Sligo won the league title with the centre-back pairing of Peers and Jason McGuinness a major part of the success.

He scored against FC Spartak Trnava in the 2012–13 UEFA Europa League.

2013 brought FAI Cup glory again but this time the final would be a bittersweet occasion for Peers as he suffered a cruciate knee ligament injury. Despite this he signed a new two-year contract at the end of the season which kept him at the club for 10 seasons. He has made the 5th most appearances in the history of the club.

Peers was awarded a testimonial by Sligo where he scored in a 3-3- draw with Portsmouth F.C. in July 2016 . 

After 346 appearances in 11 seasons at The Showgrounds, Peers departed for Dublin side St Patrick's Athletic for the 2017 season. His signing was announced by manager Liam Buckley at the club's 2016 Awards Night on 19 November 2016. Peers scored two brilliant diving headers on his Pats debut, scoring the first two goals in a 5–0 pre-season friendly win over Bluebell United at John Hyland Park on 24 January 2017. He made his competitive Pats debut seven days later as Pats beat Bray Wanderers 4–0 in the Leinster Senior Cup at the Carlisle Grounds, with Peers coming off injured in the 45th minute while 3–0 up at the time.

Peers signed for Glentoran of the NIFL Premiership in January 2019.

He signed for Warrenpoint Town F.C. in August 2020  where he spent two seasons before retiring.

In December 2022, Peers was announced as first-team coach at Longford Town.

International career

Peers, a former youth international was selected by Pat Fenlon for the Republic of Ireland national under-23 football team in 2007 and on his only appearance scored the opening goal against Slovakia.

In 2010, he was selected for the League of Ireland XI for the opening game at the Aviva Stadium.

Honours
Sligo Rovers
League of Ireland (1): 2012
FAI Cup (3): 2010, 2011, 2013
League of Ireland Cup (1): 2010
Setanta Sports Cup (1): 2014

Glentoran
Irish Cup (1): 2019-20

Career statistics
Professional appearances – correct as of 7 January 2020.

References

External links
 

1985 births
Living people
Sligo Rovers F.C. players
St Patrick's Athletic F.C. players
Derry City F.C. players
Glentoran F.C. players
League of Ireland players
NIFL Premiership players
League of Ireland XI players
Mansfield Town F.C. players
Blackburn Rovers F.C. players
Republic of Ireland under-23 international footballers
Republic of Ireland youth international footballers
English Football League players
Association football defenders
Republic of Ireland association footballers
Republic of Ireland expatriate association footballers
Expatriate footballers in England
Irish expatriate sportspeople in England
Warrenpoint Town F.C. players